Norman Gifford  (born 30 March 1940) is a retired English cricketer, who played primarily as a left-arm spinner. Gifford played county cricket for Worcestershire, and Warwickshire County Cricket Clubs, and represented England in fifteen Test matches and two One Day International between 1964 and 1985.

Cricket writer Colin Bateman said, "a spinner who pushed Derek Underwood out of the England side had to be something special, and Norman Gifford was just that. A great competitor with a deep knowledge of the game, 'Giff' could find turn from most surfaces despite firing in his left-arm deliveries".

Early career
Known to Worcestershire folk as "Apple Norm", Gifford served his apprenticeship as a professional cricketer in the Worcestershire second team during 1959, and when in May 1960 he took 2–25 from 18 overs in a drawn Second XI match against Kent, he was called up to the first team for the game against the same opposition that began the very next day. Gifford took four wickets in Kent's first innings, but Worcestershire collapsed to their second-lowest ever score of 25 all out on their way to an innings defeat. In the next game against Cambridge University Gifford took ten wickets in the match, including second-innings analysis of 15.5–7–18–6.

Recognition
Gifford finished 1960 with 41 wickets at an average of 17.90, but this only hinted at the success he was to enjoy the following year. 1961 proved to be the most productive season of Gifford's career as he took 133 wickets. In July 1961, he was notified he was on the long list to tour India and Pakistan with the Marylebone Cricket Club (MCC) side, but was not selected for the final party. In compensation he toured Rhodesia and Pakistan with an International XI. He was again fairly successful in the 1962 and 1963 seasons, with 92 and 72 wickets respectively, and in 1962 was selected for the Players in their penultimate match against the Gentlemen before the distinction between amateur and professional cricketers was abolished.

International selection
1964 was the year when Gifford really broke through as he was selected for the Second Ashes Test at Lord's in June. Although the game was ruined by rain, with no play at all possible on the first two days, Gifford had time to impress, returning miserly analyses of 12–6–14–2 in the first innings and 17–9–17–1 in the second. He was retained for the Third Test at Headingley, but took only two wickets as Australia recorded a comfortable win. It would be seven years before he played Test cricket again.

County cricketer
Worcestershire's won the County Championship in 1964, and retained their title the following year. Gifford was instrumental in these successes, and although he reached 100 wickets only in 1964, between 1963 and 1968 he averaged under 20 with the ball every season. He took his career-best bowling figures in July 1968 when he took 8–28 (albeit in a losing cause) against Yorkshire.

International recall
Gifford was recalled to the England team in 1971, replacing Derek Underwood for the Second Test against Pakistan. He was in and out of the team during the next two years, including a tour of the Indian sub-continent in 1972-3.

He played two more Tests against New Zealand the following summer, but thereafter the selectors' minds turned decisively towards Underwood and Gifford never played Test cricket again. He contented himself with consistent displays in county cricket, leading Worcestershire to another County Championship triumph in 1974, for which he was named as a Wisden Cricketer of the Year. Later he played for Worcestershire's great rivals Warwickshire, whom he joined for the 1983 season. That year he took 104 first-class wickets, the final time he was to reach the 100 mark.

One Day captain
Gifford's England career, however, was not quite over. He made his One Day International debut – extraordinarily as captain – in the absence of David Gower who was being rested, at the age of 44 in the 1984/85 'Rothmans Four-Nations Cup' contest in Sharjah. England lost both their matches, against Australia and Pakistan, but Gifford showed that he still had the ability in the second game when he took 4–23 including the prize wicket of Imran Khan for a first-ball duck. Despite this performance, however, these two games proved to be the extent of Gifford's brief ODI career.

Later years
Gifford continued to play for Warwickshire into his late forties, and when he retired from playing at the age of 48 in 1988, he had taken 2,068 first-class wickets. The reduction in the amount of first-class cricket played means that he is likely to remain the last man to have broken the 2,000 mark. Never much of a batsman, he made only three half-centuries in more than 800 innings, his 7,000 runs coming at an average of just 13. After retirement, Gifford went into coaching and became coach of first Sussex, and then Durham.

He is now a scorer for his hometown side, Ulverston C.C. He is still helping to coach youngsters at Worcestershire in    2015, sharing his wealth of knowledge and expertise.

Teams

International
England

English county
Worcestershire
Warwickshire

Other first-class
 DB Close's XI
 England B
 International Wanderers
 International XI
Marylebone Cricket Club (MCC)
 Players
 World XI

Career highlights

Tests
Test debut: vs Australia, Lord's, 1964
Last Test: vs New Zealand, Lord's, 1973
Highest score: 25* vs New Zealand, Nottingham, 1973
Best bowling: 5–55 vs Pakistan, Karachi, 1972/73

One-Day International
ODI debut: vs Australia, Sharjah, 1984/85
Last ODI: vs Pakistan, Sharjah, 1984/85
Highest score: 0 vs Pakistan, Sharjah 1984/85
Best bowling: 4–23 vs Pakistan, Sharjah 1984/85
ODI captaincy record: 2 matches; 0 wins, 2 losses

First-class
First-class debut: Worcestershire vs Kent, Tunbridge Wells, 1960
Last first-class match: Warwickshire vs Somerset, Birmingham, 1988
Highest score: 89 for Worcestershire vs Oxford University, Oxford, 1963
Best bowling: 8–28 for Worcestershire vs Yorkshire, Sheffield, 1968

List A Limited Overs
List A debut: Worcestershire vs Sussex, Lord's, 1963
Last List A match: Warwickshire vs Cambridgeshire, Birmingham, 1988
Highest score: 38 for Worcestershire vs Warwickshire, Lord's, 1966 (Gillette Cup final)
Best bowling: 6–8 for Worcestershire vs Minor Counties South, High Wycombe, 1979

References

External links

1940 births
England One Day International cricketers
England Test cricketers
English cricketers
Living people
Marylebone Cricket Club cricketers
Members of the Order of the British Empire
People from Ulverston
Players cricketers
Warwickshire cricket captains
Warwickshire cricketers
Wisden Cricketers of the Year
Worcestershire cricket captains
Worcestershire cricketers
D. B. Close's XI cricketers
Marylebone Cricket Club Touring Team cricketers
Cricketers from Cumbria